Main page: List of Canadian plants by family

Families:
A | B | C | D | E | F | G | H | I J K | L | M | N | O | P Q | R | S | T | U V W | X Y Z

Daltoniaceae 

 Daltonia splachnoides

Dennstaedtiaceae 

 Dennstaedtia punctilobula — eastern hay-scented fern
 Pteridium aquilinum — bracken fern

Diapensiaceae 

 Diapensia lapponica — Lapland diapensia

Dicranaceae 

 Aongstroemia longipes
 Arctoa anderssonii
 Arctoa fulvella
 Arctoa hyperborea
 Campylopus arctocarpus
 Campylopus atrovirens — cliff campylopus
 Campylopus flexuosus
 Campylopus fragilis
 Campylopus japonicus
 Campylopus paradoxus — paradoxical campylopus
 Campylopus schimperi
 Campylopus schwarzii
 Campylopus subulatus
 Cynodontium alpestre
 Cynodontium glaucescens
 Cynodontium jenneri
 Cynodontium polycarpon
 Cynodontium schisti
 Cynodontium strumiferum
 Cynodontium tenellum
 Dichodontium olympicum
 Dichodontium pellucidum — dichodontium moss
 Dicranella cerviculata
 Dicranella crispa
 Dicranella grevilleana
 Dicranella heteromalla
 Dicranella howei
 Dicranella pacifica
 Dicranella palustris
 Dicranella rufescens
 Dicranella schreberiana
 Dicranella stickinensis
 Dicranella subulata
 Dicranella varia
 Dicranodontium asperulum
 Dicranodontium denudatum
 Dicranodontium subporodictyon
 Dicranodontium uncinatum
 Dicranoweisia cirrata
 Dicranoweisia crispula
 Dicranum acutifolium
 Dicranum angustum
 Dicranum bonjeanii
 Dicranum brevifolium
 Dicranum condensatum — condensed dicranum moss
 Dicranum elongatum — broom-moss
 Dicranum flagellare — whip fork moss
 Dicranum fragilifolium
 Dicranum fulvum
 Dicranum fuscescens — dicranum moss
 Dicranum groenlandicum
 Dicranum howellii
 Dicranum leioneuron
 Dicranum majus
 Dicranum montanum — montane dicranum moss
 Dicranum muehlenbeckii
 Dicranum ontariense — Ontario dicranum moss
 Dicranum pallidisetum
 Dicranum polysetum — waxyleaf moss
 Dicranum scoparium — broom moss
 Dicranum spadiceum
 Dicranum spurium
 Dicranum tauricum
 Dicranum undulatum — bog broom moss
 Dicranum viride
 Kiaeria blyttii
 Kiaeria falcata
 Kiaeria glacialis
 Kiaeria starkei
 Oncophorus virens
 Oncophorus wahlenbergii
 Oreas martiana
 Paraleucobryum enerve
 Paraleucobryum longifolium
 Rhabdoweisia crispata

Dioscoreaceae 

 Dioscorea quaternata — fourleaf yam

Disceliaceae 

 Discelium nudum

Ditrichaceae 

 Ceratodon purpureus
 Distichium capillaceum
 Distichium hagenii
 Distichium inclinatum
 Ditrichum ambiguum — ambiguous ditrichum
 Ditrichum flexicaule
 Ditrichum heteromallum
 Ditrichum lineare
 Ditrichum montanum
 Ditrichum pallidum
 Ditrichum pusillum
 Ditrichum rhynchostegium
 Ditrichum schimperi
 Ditrichum zonatum
 Pleuridium acuminatum
 Pleuridium palustre
 Pleuridium subulatum
 Saelania glaucescens — blue dew moss
 Trichodon cylindricus

Droseraceae 

 Drosera anglica — English sundew
 Drosera filiformis — threadleaf sundew
 Drosera intermedia — spoon-leaved sundew
 Drosera linearis — slenderleaf sundew
 Drosera rotundifolia — roundleaf sundew
 Drosera x belezeana
 Drosera x obovata

Dryopteridaceae 

 Dryopteris arguta — coastal woodfern
 Dryopteris campyloptera — mountain woodfern
 Dryopteris carthusiana — spinulose shieldfern
 Dryopteris clintoniana — Clinton's woodfern
 Dryopteris cristata — crested shieldfern
 Dryopteris expansa — spreading woodfern
 Dryopteris filix-mas — male fern
 Dryopteris fragrans — fragrant cliff woodfern
 Dryopteris goldieana — Goldie's woodfern
 Dryopteris intermedia — evergreen woodfern
 Dryopteris marginalis — marginal woodfern
 Dryopteris x algonquinensis
 Dryopteris x benedictii
 Dryopteris x boottii
 Dryopteris x burgessii
 Dryopteris x dowellii
 Dryopteris x mickelii
 Dryopteris x neowherryi
 Dryopteris x pittsfordensis
 Dryopteris x slossoniae
 Dryopteris x triploidea
 Dryopteris x uliginosa
 Matteuccia struthiopteris — ostrich fern
 Onoclea sensibilis — sensitive fern
 Polystichum acrostichoides — Christmas fern
 Polystichum andersonii — Anderson's holly fern
 Polystichum braunii — Braun's holly fern
 Polystichum imbricans — narrowleaf swordfern
 Polystichum kruckebergii — Kruckeberg's swordfern
 Polystichum kwakiutlii — Kwakiutl's holly fern
 Polystichum lemmonii — Shasta fern
 Polystichum lonchitis — northern holly fern
 Polystichum munitum — western swordfern
 Polystichum scopulinum — mountain holly fern
 Polystichum setigerum — Alaska holly fern
 Polystichum x hagenahii
 Polystichum x potteri

Canada,family,D